Francis Kirimi Muthaura (born 20 October 1946 in Meru, Kenya) is a Kenyan former civil servant and close ally of former President Mwai Kibaki. He is the former Head of Civil Service and Secretary to the Cabinet.

From 14 March 1996 to 24 April 2001 he was the Secretary General of the East African Community. Previously, he held several ambassadorial positions under the rule of former president Daniel arap Moi.

He was appointed the chairman of the board of the Kenyan Revenue Authority by President Uhuru Kenyatta on 25 May 2018.

Civil Service career
Muthaura had a long career in the Civil Service. After leaving the University of Nairobi in 1972, he was appointed the District Commissioner of Mombasa District, a position he held until 1973. He was then appointed an Assistant Secretary in the Ministry of Foreign Affairs.

Education
He attended Nkubu Secondary School from 1966. In 1968, he joined Nyeri High School. He attended the University of Nairobi from 1969 to 1972 and graduated with a Bachelor of Arts (BA) degree in Economics and Political Science. He also has a Diploma in International Relations, also from the University of Nairobi. He was later appointed Secretary to the cabinet in 2005.

2007 elections
In March 2008, following an agreement between the government and opposition to establish a coalition government to end a political crisis, Muthaura stirred controversy by saying that Kibaki would remain both head of state and head of government. This interpretation of the agreement would mean less power than the Orange Democratic Movement (ODM) had anticipated for its leader, Raila Odinga, who was expected to become Prime Minister under the deal; the ODM angrily rejected Muthaura's interpretation.

Muthaura has been named as an instigator of post-election violence in 2007 – 2008 and was named among six suspects to be prosecuted by the International Criminal Court. He was accused of leading secret meetings in Kibaki's office, where revenge attacks against supporters of Kibaki's opposition were planned. The ICC prosecutor claimed he authorised the use of excessive force against protesters by the police. He was taped by two people posing as students, who claimed he had admitted involvement in post-election violence. On 11 March 2013, the charges against Muthaura were dropped by the ICC following the discrediting of a key witness.

Succession table

References

External links
Francis Muthaura's Official Website

Kenyan politicians
1946 births
Living people
Meru people
Kenyan diplomats
Alumni of Nyeri High School
University of Nairobi alumni
People from Eastern Province (Kenya)
People from Meru County
People indicted by the International Criminal Court
East African Community officials